Austroliotia scalaris, is a species of sea snail, a marine gastropod mollusk in the family Liotiidae. Liotiids are commonly known as wheel shells.

Description
The size of the shell varies between 5 mm and 8 mm and the height of the shell is equal to its width.

The shell of this mollusc is moderately solid, with angled whorls. The last whorl has seven or eight spiral ribs. These consist of two weak ribs on the shoulder; three or four strong ribs on the periphery; one weak rib on the outside of the base; one large, beaded rib bordering the umbilicus and one beaded rib within the umbilicus. The ribs on the periphery have open-fronted spines, the uppermost being the largest. The whole surface is covered with dense axial lamellae. The snail's aperture is circular and surrounded by a thickened varix. The umbilicus is deep and narrow, with strong axial lamellae within. The colours of these shells are uniformly white or fawn.

Distribution
This marine species is endemic to Australia. It occurs off Queensland and New South Wales, from Fraser Island in Queensland, to Brush Island in southern New South Wales.
It is a subtidal species that is found in moderately deep water.

Footnotes

References
 Hedley, C. 1903. Scientific results of the trawling expedition of H.M.C.S. "Thetis" off the coast of New South Wales in February and March, 1898, pt. 6. Memoirs of the Australian Museum 4(1): 326–402 [336] (as Liotia tasmanica var. scalaris)
 Iredale, T. & McMichael, D.F. 1962. A reference list of the marine Mollusca of New South Wales. Memoirs of the Australian Museum 11: 1–109 
 Jenkins, B.W. 1984. Southern Australian Liotiidae. Australian Shell News 47: 3–5
 Wilson, B. 1993. Australian Marine Shells. Prosobranch Gastropods. Kallaroo, Western Australia : Odyssey Publishing Vol. 1 408 pp

External links
 
  Australian Faunal Directory: Austroliotia scalaris

scalaris
Gastropods described in 1903